South Dakota Dept. of Transportation Bridge No. 56-090-096, near Forestburg in Sanborn County, South Dakota, is a Warren pony truss bridge built by the Iowa Bridge Company in 1912.  It was listed on the National Register of Historic Places in 1993.

It brought a local road across Sand Creek.  It was a single-span, steel bridge with a mix of bolted and riveted connections, resting on concrete abutments with wing walls.  It was located about six miles east of Woonsocket.

The bridge was replaced between 2006 and 2008

References

Bridges in South Dakota
National Register of Historic Places in South Dakota
Buildings and structures completed in 1912
Sanborn County, South Dakota